Oliver Benítez Paz (born 7 June 1991) is an Argentine professional footballer who plays as a centre-back.

Career
Born in Puerto Iguazú, Misiones, Benítez finished his formation with Gimnasia La Plata. On 6 November 2010 he made his first-team – and Primera División – debut, coming on as a late substitute for Milton Casco in a 1–0 home win against Quilmes.

Benítez remained as a backup during the following years, also suffering relegation in 2012. He scored his first senior goal on 28 May 2013, netting the last in a 2–0 away win against Instituto in the Primera B Nacional.

After being immediately promoted back to the top tier, Benítez was more utilized in the main squad, but as a left back. He scored his first goal in the category on 16 August 2015, netting his team's second in a 4–2 home success over Argentinos Juniors.

References

External links
 
 
 
 

1991 births
Living people
Sportspeople from Misiones Province
Argentine footballers
Argentine expatriate footballers
Association football defenders
Argentine Primera División players
Primera Nacional players
Chilean Primera División players
Super League Greece players
Club de Gimnasia y Esgrima La Plata footballers
Club Atlético Tigre footballers
Club Deportivo Palestino footballers
San Martín de Tucumán footballers
Club Atlético Patronato footballers
PAS Lamia 1964 players
Expatriate footballers in Chile
Argentine expatriate sportspeople in Chile
Expatriate footballers in Greece
Argentine expatriate sportspeople in Greece